John F. Gavin (9 February 1874 – 6 January 1938) was a pioneer Australian film actor and director, one of the early filmmakers of the 1910s. He is best known for making films about bushrangers such as Captain Thunderbolt, Captain Moonlite, Ben Hall and Frank Gardiner.  Known informally as 'Jack', Gavin worked in collaboration with his wife Agnes, who scripted many of his films.

Film historians Graham Shirley and Brian Adams have written; "although Gavin was prolific his later surviving work shows that his entrepreneurial talent outweighed any he might have had as director."

Amongst several claims made later in life or soon after his death was one that he had made Australia's first animated short, an advertising film which featured a koala "lapping up a cough remedy".

Biography

John F. Gavin was born in Sydney on 9 February 1874, the eldest child of Francis Gavin and Catherine (née O'Brien).  Gavin later claimed he worked for a circus as a ten year-old. He moved to the country and worked as a cattle drover, being involved in a record cattle drive from Camooweal in Queensland to Adelaide. "A man of fine physique and imposing presence" he served for a time in the Sydney Lancers as the captain of a squadron. He was interested in acting and received an offer to join the touring company of Bland Holt. He stayed with them for a number of seasons, then travelled to the USA where he worked with Barnum and Bailey's Circus, and Buffalo Bill's Wild West Show. He married Agnes in 1898.

Gavin returned to Australia and organised his own Wild West Show which was successful at the Melbourne Cyclorama, although he experienced a number of legal troubles. Gavin eventually had a company of 150 before moving into filmmaking. In 1908, he started managing theatres which he did for the next few years.

Filmmaking debut

His debut feature was about Thunderbolt, produced by H. A. Forsyth, and its success launched his career. As one writer later put it:
With the aid of a gallant, if small, company of triers, including Mrs. Gavin as scenario writer and leading lady, and himself as leading juvenile, he turned out several films dealing with the convict and bushranging eras. There were no such things as studios then, and all scenes, exteriors and interiors, had to be shot in the open with Old Sol supplying the light. The results were considered quite satisfactory, and the pictures made money.
He followed this up with Moonlite and by February 1911 it was written that "more film has been used over Jack Gavin than over any other Australian biograph actor." He was described as "the beauteous bushranger".

A newspaper profile attributed the success of Gavin's bushranging films to two main factors: the quality of horsemanship in them, and the fact they were normally shot on the real locations where the events occurred.

Another writer stated in 1911 that "The pictures already turned out by Mr. Gavin demonstrates that in bio graphic art Australian producers are in no way behind their European and American brothers. Clearness in detail and execution, with the cleverly-constructed stories by Agnes Gavin enable Mr. Gavin to offer attractive films."

A newspaper wrote a ballad about Gavin:
He played as Ben Hall, Moonlight too.
He's also played with Holt.
And on the screen he's to be seen.
Dressed up as Thunderbolt. 
Whilst acting he has cried,'Bail up'.
And put the tops to rout; 
In fact, he knows more bail up
Than some chaps are bailed out.
He poses as a cut-throat fierce, 
With pistols and a frown; 
But looks a harmless sort of cuss 
When strutting round the town.
Gavin's films were also often accompanied by popular lecturer Charles Woods.

His first two movies were made for H.A. Forsyth at Southern Cross Motion Pictures but he and Forsyth had a falling out and Gavin went his separate way, publicly announcing the fact in January 1911.

In July 1911 he set up his own company, the Gavin Photo Play Company, based out of Waverley.

He was involved in the formation of the Australian Photo-Play Company but then established his own production company in October 1911. When bushranging films were banned in 1912 he turned to dramatising other true characters, such as Edith Cavell and Charles Fryatt.

In 1912 Gavin was arrested for owing money to a business associate, though he was later released.

In January 1917 he took out a lease on a studio at North Sydney and announced plans for make four feature films over a year, starting with The Murder of Captain Fryatt. He also started up a film school and spoke of offers from America.

Gavin was also credited as directing the first Australian advertising short film, a koala using a cough syrup.

Move to the US
Making movies in Australia was becoming increasingly difficult for him so Gavin moved to Hollywood, where he lived for eight years in all, appearing in what he claimed were over 300 films and becoming a friend of Lon Chaney Rudolph Valentino and Stan Laurel.

He reportedly also worked with Harold Lloyd and Snub Pollard.

Gavin claimed he helped popularise the drinking of tea in Hollywood.

Return to Australia
He returned to Australia in February 1922 to make several outback films, including a serial based on Ned Kelly, and set up a company in Brisbane, but faced censorship problems and could not raise the capital.

He went back to Hollywood in May 1923, then returned to Australia in 1925.

He gave evidence at the 1928 Royal Commission on the Moving Picture Industry in Australia arguing in favour of a quota for Australian films.

Personality
He was described as "a big man with a generous and naive personality... more enthusiasm and stubborn persistence than talent." Towards the end of his life he lived in a flat in Neutral bay and suffered from rheumatism.

He died in 1938 survived by Agnes and their daughters. A child had predeceased him in 1917.

Filmography
Thunderbolt (1910)
Moonlite (1910) (a. k. a. Captain Moonlite)
Ben Hall and his Gang (1911)
Frank Gardiner, the King of the Road (1911)
Keane of Kalgoorlie (1911)
The Assigned Servant (1911)
The Mark of the Lash (1911)
The Drover's Sweetheart (1911)
Assigned to his Wife (1911)
A Melbourne Mystery (1913)
The Martyrdom of Nurse Cavell (1916)
An Interrupted Divorce (1916)
Cast Up By the Sea (1916)

Charlie at the Sydney Show (1916)
The Murder of Captain Fryatt (1917)
His Convict Bride (1918) (a. k. a. For the Term of Her Natural Life)
The Prisoner of the Pines (1919) – actor only
The Fighting Tylers – actor only
The White Sheep (1924) – actor only
Tell It to a Policeman (1925) – actor only
Official Officers (1925) – actor only
Sherlock Sleuth (1925) – actor only
Yes, Yes, Nanette (1925) – actor only
Innocent Husbands (1925) – actor only
No Father to Guide Him (1925) – actor only
The Outlaw's Daughter (1925) – actor only
Breakin' Loose (1925) – actor only
Good Cheer (1926) – actor only
The Old War-Horse (1926) – actor only
For Heaven's Sake! (1927) – actor only, with Harold Lloyd
The Fluttering Hearts (1927) – actor only
The Adorable Outcast (1928) – actor only
Trooper O'Brien (1928)

Unmade films
The Lubra's Revenge – announced to follow Drover's Sweetheart in 1911
The White Hope – announced November 1911 – a boxing story where Gavin would play a character who fights an aboriginal (according to a contemporary article in the film "the Australian aboriginal will be shown in quite a new light, and though we are not at liberty to disclose the plot just yet, we can safely say that it will outrival the well known Red Indian dramas.")
story of Russian life in World War I
The Birth of Australia (1916) – a look at the history of Australia from the landing of Captain Cook at Botany Bay onwards – Gavin blamed the delay of this on war taxes and expressed interest in making the film in California
The Song That Reached My Heart (1916) starring Vera Amee
The Black Snake – a 15-part serial set in the Australian bush (1917)
film starring Arthur Shirley with location shooting in Hawaii
signed Nellie Stewart to a five-picture contract
The Kelly Gang (announced 1922)
biopic of Boy Charlton

Theatre
Professor Fenton's Circus and Buck Jumping Show (1907)
Deadwood Dick by Capt Jack Gavin's Wild West Dramatic Company (1907)

References

External links

John Gavin at National Film and Sound Archive

1910s in Australian cinema
Australian film directors
1875 births
1938 deaths
People from Sydney